List of all DC Comics' Wonder Woman storylines.

Storylines

Current
 All Star Comics 
 Batman/Superman/Wonder Woman: Trinity  
 Comic Cavalcade
 Sensation Comics
 Superman and Wonder Woman: The Hidden Killer
 Superman/Wonder Woman
 Wonder Woman: Amazonia
 Wonder Woman: The Blue Amazon
 The Wonder Woman Chronicles  
 The World's Greatest Superheroes

Retired
 Introducing Wonder Woman (1941)
 Gods and Mortals (1987)
 Challenge of the Gods (1987–88)
 War of the Gods (1991)
 The Contest (1994)
 The Challenge of Artemis (1995)
 Paradise Lost (2001)
 Our Worlds at War (2001)
 The Hiketeia (2002)
 Down to Earth (2003–04)
 Who Is Wonder Woman? (2006–07)
 Amazons Attack! (2007)
 The Circle (2008)
 Ends of the Earth (2008)
 Rise of the Olympian (2009)
 Flashpoint (2011)

Collected editions

Chronicles

Archive editions

Showcase

Volume 1

Volume 2

Volume 3

Volume 4

Volume 5

Original graphic novels

Wonder Woman '77

Sensation Comics featuring Wonder Woman

Superman / Wonder Woman

Miscellaneous

References

See also
 Wonder Woman
 Wonder Woman in other media
 Publication history of Wonder Woman
 List of Spider-Man storylines
 https://sabrcomics.com/products/wonder-woman-80

 
Lists of comic book story arcs